Jawala Prasad Jyotishi (born 14 March 1909) was an Indian politician from the Indian National Congress party. He was a member of the 2nd & 3rd Lok sabha of India. He won the 1957 & 1962 General election of India from Sagar Lok Sabha constituency.

He was also a Member of Legislative Assembly of Sagar Vidhan Sabha between 1972 and 1977.

Pandit Jwala Prasad Jyotishi Institute of Performing and FIne Arts is being run in his name. The institute is located at Civil Lines, Sagar (M.P).

References

India MPs 1962–1967
India MPs 1957–1962
Lok Sabha members from Madhya Pradesh
People from Sagar district
1909 births
1997 deaths
People from Narsinghpur district
Indian National Congress politicians from Madhya Pradesh